Doar is the surname of an aristocratic family in the southern United States.  Prior to the American Civil War, family members were among the largest landowners in the South. The family's fortune in the U.S. originates mainly from plantations in Charleston, Georgetown, Berkeley, Orangeburg, Barnwell and Beaufort Counties, South Carolina. Among the plantations that the Doar family owned are: Doar Plantation, Doar Point Plantation, Palo Alto (now part of the University Of South Carolina International Center for Public Health Research), Harrietta (on the National Register of Historic Places including the Doar Family Cemetery), Woodville, Walnut Grove, Montgomery, Oak Grove, Buck Hall, Egremont, Elmwood, Woodside, Hopsewee (National Register of Historic Places and birthplace of Thomas Lynch, Jr., who signed the Declaration of Independence), Wedge and Windsor.

The Doars are related to other historic families including the Cordes, Duval, Porcher de Richbourg, Lucas, Gadsden, Screven, Heyward, Pinckney, Horry, Middleton, Hume, Heyward and the De Wolf family among others. They are included in Our Family Circle, which is a (private) guide to the Who's Who of Southern Families.

The Doars were among the founding members of the Church of England in the southeastern U.S. and were instrumental in helping to open the first public schools in the south, mainly in Charleston County, SC.

Doar Point (a geographical location) is on the S.C. coast.

Doar Road (State Road 432), Charleston to Awendaw, SC

See also
 List of most common surnames in North America

References

Sources
 Doar, David. 1936. Rice and Rice Planting in the South Carolina Lowcountry
 University of South Carolina Institute for Southern Studies

External links
 http://src1.cas.sc.edu/dept2/iss/SCNames/index.php?action=showPage&book=2&volume=14&page=35 - 35k - Cached - Similar pages
 http://src1.cas.sc.edu/dept2/iss/SCNames/index.php?action=showPage&book=1&volume=3&page=12
 South Carolina SC Plantations
 
 St. James-Santee Chapel of Ease | Wayback Machine
 McCLELLANVILLE EPISCOPAL CHURCH (c. 1890) | St. James-Santee Episcopal Church
 ST. JAMES SANTEE, PLANTATION PARISH, HISTORY AND RECORDS, 1685-1925

Families